Tharika is an Indian actress who has appeared in Tamil films and television serials. She first appeared in a character role in Bharathiraja's Eera Nilam before she shifted to item numbers.

She participated in season 1 of the reality dance show Jodi Number One.

Filmography

Films

Television series
Tamil
 Marabhu Kavithaigal
 Chiththi as Shwetha
 "Premi" as Preethi 
 Getti Melam
 Kalki
 Lakshmi
 Sivamayam
 Thavam
 Simran Thirai
 Poi Solla Porom
 Ramany vs. Ramany Part II
Malayalam
Unniyarcha (Asianet) as Unniyarcha
Kavyanjali (Surya TV)

References

External links
 

Living people
Tamil actresses
Indian film actresses
Actresses from Tamil Nadu
Year of birth missing (living people)
Actresses in Kannada cinema
Actresses in Telugu cinema
Actresses in Tamil cinema
Actresses in Malayalam television
Actresses in Tamil television